Overthrow may refer to:

 Overthrow, a change in government, often achieved by force or through a coup d'état.
The 5th October Overthrow, or Bulldozer Revolution, the events of 2000 that led to the downfall of Slobodan Milošević in the former Yugoslavia
Overthrow of the Hawaiian Monarchy, the 1893 coup d'état by European and American businessmen that overthrew Queen Lili`uokalani of Hawai'i
 Independence
 Overthrow (book), a 2006 book by Stephen Kinzer about the United States's involvement in overthrowing governments
 Overthrow (cricket), an extra run scored by a batsman as a result of the ball not being collected by a fielder in the centre, having been thrown in from the outfield
 Overthrow (structure), the crowning section of ornamental wrought iron work which forms a decorative crest above a wrought iron gate
 Overthrow (comics), a DC Comics supervillain who fought the Blue Beetle
 Overthrow, a 2001 EP by American death metal band Misery Index